Sarafina El-Badry Nance is an American science communicator, astrophysicist and Ph.D. student in the Department of Astronomy, University of California, Berkeley. Her research focuses on supernovae and their applications to cosmology. Nance is known for her use of social media, in particular Twitter, where she discusses astrophysics and activism. She is also an advocate for women's health and science, technology, engineering, and mathematics.

Early life and education 
Nance grew up in Austin, Texas. She became interested in the solar system as a child, and used to listen to StarDate on the radio on her way home from school. She has said that her St. Stephen's Episcopal School's high school physics teacher, Frank Mikan, encouraged her love of space science. 

In 2016, Nance received a dual B.S. degree in physics and astronomy from the University of Texas at Austin's College of Natural Sciences. Her honors thesis was titled "A Theoretical Investigation of Supernovae Progenitors". Her advisor was J. Craig Wheeler. There she used asteroseismology to understand stars that were about to undergo a supernova. Her research focussed on Betelgeuse. While an undergraduate student at the UT Austin, Nance was named a Dean's Honour scholarship and took part in a National Science Foundation summer program at Harvard University.

Career
In 2017, Nance moved to the University of California, Berkeley for her graduate studies, where she investigates supernovae and uses them as a means to study both the make-up and ultimate fate of the universe. Here she earned an M.S. in astronomy, before beginning a doctoral programme. In particular, Nance studies the evolutionary state of Betelgeuse. She works with the Lawrence Berkeley National Laboratory Centre for Computational Cosmology to use supercomputers to build models of the explosions of supernovae in their final stages. In March 2021, Nance was listed by Forbes magazine as one of 30 inspirational women as part of Women's History Month.

Science communication 
During the first year of her undergraduate degree Nance worked as an intern at the McDonald Observatory. After starting her doctoral degree, Nance took to her science communication online. One of her viral tweets on Twitter, which highlighted how important failure was in science, was picked up by Sundar Pichai.

Nance is an activist for women's health. In her early 20s it was identified that she had inherited the BRCA2 gene from her father, which is known to be a predictor of breast cancer. Nance used a crowdfunding campaign to raise money to cover the cost of a double mastectomy, and her social media platform to advocate for early and frequent testing as well as preventative medicine. After searching for the best local surgeons, Nance identified Anne Peled, a Californian reconstructive surgeon who was also a survivor of breast cancer. Nance underwent the surgery in 2019.

On January 15, 2021, Seeker released the internet television astronomy series Constellations, hosted by Nance.

Selected publications

References

External links 
 
 Sarafina Nance at University of California, Berkeley, Department of Astronomy
 
Constellations - Here’s Why Zodiac Constellations Are Still Used in Astronomy

21st-century American women scientists
American women astronomers
American astrophysicists
Living people
Women astrophysicists
Year of birth missing (living people)
University of Texas at Austin alumni
University of California, Berkeley alumni
University of California, Berkeley faculty